XHBU-FM is a radio station in Chihuahua, Chihuahua. Broadcasting on 91.7 FM, XHBU is owned by MegaRadio and brands as La Norteñita.

History
XHBU received its concession on December 7, 1936 as XEBU-AM 620. It was owned by Feliciano López Islas, who founded XEFI-AM, until 1943, when it was sold to Enriqueta Gill. In 1951, Roberto Ogilvie Stevenson Torrijos bought XEBU.

In 1968, Grupo Radio Divertida bought XEBU, and the concessionaire name changed in 1976 to Radio Sistema de Chihuahua. In 2009, it was sold to MegaRadio.

References

Radio stations in Chihuahua
Mass media in Chihuahua City